Helen Lombard, born Helen Cassin Carusi and later known as Helen Carusi Vischer (1904–1986) was an American journalist, best known for her insider's book of Washington gossip, Washington Waltz (1941).

Background

Helen Cassin Carusi was born in 1904 in Washington, DC.  Her father, Charles Francis Carusi, was chancellor of National University and a member of the Washington DC board of education.  Her great-grandfather was Stephen Cassin (1783–1857), a United States Navy officer during the First Barbary War and the War of 1812.  Lombard attended Holton-Arms School.

Career
In 1913, young Helen Cassin Carusi christened the USS Cassin (DD-43).  In 1935, she christened the USS Cassin (DD-372).

In 1951, after marrying Peter Vischer, husband and wife moved to the "Habre de Venture" historic house in Port Tobacco and raised thoroughbred horses in Charles County, Maryland.

Personal life and death
In 1927 Helen Cassin Carusi married Colonel Emanuel Eugene Lombard, a French diplomat (military attache) who died in 1946; they had a son, Charles Francis Lombard.  By 1947, she had married Washington columnist Constantine Brown, but they divorced. In 1951, she married Peter Vischer, a former Army colonel and State Department official (died 1967); he had a daughter from a previous marriage, Joanna Vischer Brown.

Lombard was a member of the Daughters of the American Revolution, the Society of Daughters of 1812, the Charles County Children's Aid Society, and the Charles County Garden Club.

In 1977, Lombard moved to the Charles County Nursing Home in La Plata, Maryland, where, known as Helen C. Vischer, she died age 81 on May 11, 1986.

Legacy

On March 31, 1947, conservative US Representative George Anthony Dondero called Lombard herself (by then, "Mrs. Brown") "one of the best known women in Washington, herself a scribe of wide experience, brilliant author of a book entitled Washington Waltz... [and] While They Fought."

Works
Lombard published two books:  Washington Waltz, which recounted her life as a Washington hostess, and While They Fought, which recounted events during World War II.  The liberal New Yorker deemed While They Fought "rather untidy" and largely "undocumented," while the conservative Human Events found it "valuable." While They Fought came out no later than March 1947, when Representative Dondero mentioned it publicly.

Books
 Washington Waltz (1941)
 While They Fought (1947)

See also
 USS Cassin (DD-43)
 USS Cassin (DD-372)

References

1904 births
1986 deaths
American women journalists
Journalists from Washington, D.C.
20th-century American women
20th-century American people